I've Got the Music in Me is the third album by Thelma Houston featuring Pressure Cooker.

It was recorded live to master disc and was released by Sheffield Lab in 1975, Cat# Lab-2.
Featuring the vocals of Thelma Houston and session players including Larry Knechtel, Lincoln Mayorga, Larry Carlton, Jim Gordon, Tom Scott, Michael Omartian and others.

Track listings
"I've Got the Music in Me" – (Bias Boshell) – 2:44
"Reggae Tune" (Instrumental) (Andy Fairweather Low) – 3:21
"To Know You Is to Love You" (Stevie Wonder, Syreeta Wright) – 3:57
"Pressure Cooker" (Instrumental) (Mike Melvoin, Bill Schnee) – 4:24
"Don't Misunderstand" (Gordon Parks) – 3:21
"Step in Time" (Instrumental) (Michael Omartian, Mark Tulin) – 3:22
"Dish Rag (Instrumental) (Michael Omartian) – 3:35
"Got to Get You into My Life"/"I've Got the Music In Me" (Reprise) (John Lennon, Paul McCartney / Bias Boshell) – 4:15

Personnel
 Thelma Houston – vocals
 Larry Knechtel, Lincoln Mayorga, Mike Melvoin, Michael Omartian – keyboards
 Larry Carlton, Dean Parks – guitar
 Reinie Press – bass guitar
 Jim Gordon, Jim Keltner – drums
 Gary Coleman, Victor Feldman – percussion
 Chuck Findley, Paul Hubinon – trumpet
 Dick Hyde, Lew McCreary – trombone
 Jim Horn, Tom Scott – saxophone
 Richard Perissi – French horn
 Morgan Ames, Jim Gilstrap, Myrna Matthews, Marti McCall, Lisa Roberts, Jackie Ward – background vocals
 Mike Melvoin, Michael Omartian – arranger
 Lincoln Mayorga – conductor
Technical
 Doug Sax, Lincoln Mayorga – executive producer
 Bill Schnee – recording engineer
 Christina Farley – album design & photography
 Pat Nagel – cover illustration

References

External links

1975 albums
Thelma Houston albums
Albums produced by Bill Schnee